Oliver Ian Banks (born 21 September 1992) is an English professional footballer who plays as a midfielder for National League side Chesterfield.

Banks formerly played for Rotherham United, Sheffield, Buxton, Stalybridge Celtic, Gainsborough Trinity, Scarborough Athletic, North Ferriby United, FC United of Manchester, Chesterfield, Northampton Town, Oldham Athletic, Tranmere Rovers, Swindon Town and Barrow.

Early and personal life
Banks is the son of former professional footballer Ian Banks.

Career
Banks began his career with Rotherham United, scoring on his professional debut in May 2011. While with Rotherham he spent loan spells at Sheffield, Buxton and Stalybridge Celtic. He made a total of 11 appearances for Stalybridge in all competitions.

He was released by Rotherham in May 2012. He then went on trial with York City in July 2012. Following a trial with the club, he signed for Gainsborough Trinity in August 2012. He later played for Scarborough Athletic, North Ferriby United and FC United of Manchester. He made a total of 18 appearances for FC United of Manchester in all competitions. While playing semi-professionally for FCUM he also worked part-time as a kitchen fitter.

In September 2013, Banks signed a professional contract with Chesterfield. In November 2013 he received the Football League's Young Player of the Month award. In April 2014 it was announced that Banks would be ruled out of the rest of the 2013–14 season through injury. He signed a new contract with the club in May 2014.

He moved on loan to Northampton Town in November 2014.

He signed for Oldham Athletic in July 2016. He scored his first goal for Oldham in an EFL Trophy tie against Carlisle United on 30 August 2016.

In November 2017, Banks signed for  Tranmere Rovers on a one-month loan deal. He moved on loan to Swindon Town in January 2018.

At the end of the 2017–18 season, when Oldham were relegated to League Two, Banks was one of seven players released by the club.

Following his release he re-signed for Tranmere Rovers in May 2018 on a two year contract. Banks signed a further one year deal with the club ahead of the 2020–21 season.

In January 2021 he moved to Barrow. he signed a new two-and-a-half year contract with the club in January 2022. In June 2022, Banks had his contract terminated by mutual consent.

On 1 July 2022, Banks rejoined National League club Chesterfield on a two-year deal, six years after he had previously left the club. In the first league match of the season, he had to play for over an hour as a goalkeeper, after Lucas Covolan was sent off.

Career statistics

Honours
Tranmere Rovers
EFL League Two play-offs: 2019

References

1992 births
Living people
Footballers from Rotherham
English footballers
Association football midfielders
Rotherham United F.C. players
Sheffield F.C. players
Buxton F.C. players
Stalybridge Celtic F.C. players
Gainsborough Trinity F.C. players
Scarborough Athletic F.C. players
North Ferriby United A.F.C. players
F.C. United of Manchester players
Chesterfield F.C. players
Northampton Town F.C. players
Oldham Athletic A.F.C. players
Tranmere Rovers F.C. players
Swindon Town F.C. players
Barrow A.F.C. players
English Football League players
National League (English football) players
People educated at Wath Academy
Northern Premier League players